George Dalgarno (c. 1616 – 1687) was a Scottish intellectual interested in linguistic problems. Originally from Aberdeen, he later worked as a schoolteacher in Oxford in collaboration with John Wilkins, although the two parted company intellectually in 1659.

Life
Dalgarno matriculated at Marischal College, Aberdeen, in 1631. Subsequently, he was a schoolteacher in Oxford in the 1650s. In 1657, he was encouraged to upgrade a system of shorthand on which he was working, by Samuel Hartlib, to a more ambitious universal system and he published on the subject later the same year. This effort brought him into contact with members of the Oxford Philosophical Club, one of the precursors of the Royal Society.

Works
Dalgarno was the author of Didascalocophus or the Deaf and Dumb man's tutor (1680), which proposed a totally new linguistic system for use by deaf mutes. 

Dalgarno was also interested in constructing what he called a 'philosophical language', now more usually referred to as universal language. A modern translation of his Ars signorum (Art of Signs, 1661) was published in 2001 in an edition that also includes his autobiography and other manuscript writings.

Notes

References
 David Cram and Jaap Maat, (eds.), George Dalgarno on Universal Language: The Art of Signs (1661), The Deaf and Dumb Man's Tutor (1680), and the Unpublished Papers, Oxford: Oxford University Press, 2001.
 Umberto Eco, The Search for the Perfect Language, Fontana Press, 1997, pp. 228–237

External links

 
 

1616 births
1687 deaths
Alumni of the University of Aberdeen
Constructed language creators
Scottish linguists
17th-century Scottish people
Scottish scholars and academics
People from Aberdeen
Scottish schoolteachers
Scottish philosophers
Scottish autobiographers
17th-century Scottish writers